Haddina Kannu is a 1980 Indian Kannada-language film directed by A. V. Seshagiri Rao and produced by P. Krishna Raj. The film stars Shankar Nag, Srinath, Lokesh and Manjula. The film was scripted and presented by L. S. Iyer.

Cast
 Shankar Nag as Vikram 
 Manjula as Benne Bhagya
 Srinath as Vinod
 Lokesh as Rudra
 Dwarakish as Dose Damodara
 Sundar Krishna Urs as Prathap
 Musuri Krishnamurthy as Constable Kariyanna
 Tiger Prabhakar 
 Jayamalini
 Vajramuni as Bhadrappa
 K. S. Ashwath as Dharmappa
 Jyothi Lakshmi
 Pramila Joshai as Chenni
 M. Jayashree

Soundtrack
The music of the film was composed by Satyam with lyrics penned by Chi. Udaya Shankar.

Track list

References

External links
 
 Haddina Kannu info

1980 films
1980s Kannada-language films
Indian action films
Films scored by Satyam (composer)
Films directed by A. V. Seshagiri Rao
1980 action films